Severomorsk-3  (also referred to as Malyavr or Murmansk Northeast) is an air base of the Russian Navy's Northern Fleet in Murmansk Oblast, Russia.

The base is home to the 100th Independent Shipborne Fighter Aviation Regiment with the Mikoyan MiG-29KR/KUBR (ASCC: Fulcrum-D) and the 279th Independent Shipborne Fighter Aviation Regiment with the Kamov Ka-52K "Katran", Sukhoi Su-25UTG (ASCC: Frogfoot) & Sukhoi Su-33 (ASCC: Flanker-D).

History

The base was used by the:
 987th Maritime Missile Aviation Regiment between 1952 and 1993 with the Tu-16.

In the late 1950s, Severomorsk-3 was an operating location for Tupolev Tu-16 Badger medium bombers and featured an 8200 ft (2500 m) concrete runway.  In 1970 and 1971, Tu-16 jets in Egyptian Air Force markings were observed conducting training flights at Severomorsk-3. During the 1970s, the airfield was designated as a Yakovlev Yak-38 Forger base for the Murmansk area whenever its parent Kiev-class aircraft carrier was in port.  Extensive Marston Mat planking was laid at the base in the late 1970s to support the Yak-38's VTOL requirements.

After the USSR's breakup, the main operator of Severomorsk-3 was the 279th Independent Naval Shturmovik Aviation Regiment (279 OMShAP) which joined the base during October 1976, operating at least 41 Sukhoi Su-25 aircraft in 1992, with 4 Su-25UB and 5 Su-25UTG trainers, plus 27 Yakovlev Yak-38 and 1 Yak-38U aircraft. The unit changed its name to the 279th Independent Shipborne Fighter Aviation Regiment (279 OKIAP) sometime between 1992 and 2016 and it made up of two fighter and one training squadrons operating the Sukhoi Su-33, Sukhoi Su-27UB & Su-25UTG.

The Russian Navy's ZEVS-ELF Transmitter is located directly south of Severomorsk-3.

See also
Severomorsk

References

Installations of the Russian Navy
Soviet Naval Aviation bases
Airports in Murmansk Oblast